HC Biasca Ticino Rockets  is a Swiss professional ice hockey team who play in Biasca of the Riviera in the canton of Ticino. They have played since the 2016–17 season in the Swiss League (SL), the second tier of the main professional ice hockey league in Switzerland, behind the National League.

History
The club was originally founded in 1987 as HC Iragna. Later it was renamed HC Biasca 3 Valli. Since 1992, the franchise has played in the Pista di ghiacco di Biasca, which was renamed in 2016 Raiffeisen BiascArena.

After winning the Swiss Regio league in 2016, HC Biasca submitted an application to play in the National League B. After approval, the club was renamed the HCB Ticino Rockets, with the purpose to serve as an affiliate club to shareholders and National League clubs' HC Ambrì-Piotta and HC Lugano.

Honors
Swiss Regio League: (1) 2016

References

External links
 HCB Ticino Rockets official website

 
Ice hockey clubs established in 1987
Ticino